Siparuna gentryana is an evergreen monoecious tree which grows to 20 m in height. It is found in primary forest habitats in western Ecuador and Colombia. It is similar to the more widespread Siparuna cristata but can be distinguished by its much smaller fruits which are spiny rather than smooth.

References

New species of Siparuna

Siparunaceae
Trees of Colombia
Trees of Ecuador
Plants described in 2000